Martin David Robinson (September 26, 1925 – December 8, 1982), known professionally as Marty Robbins, was an American singer, songwriter, actor, multi-instrumentalist, and NASCAR racing driver. Robbins was one of the most popular and successful country and western singers for most of his nearly four-decade career, which spanned from the late 1940s to the early 1980s. He was also an early outlaw country pioneer.

Born in Glendale, Arizona, Robbins taught himself guitar while serving in the United States Navy during World War II, and subsequently drew fame performing in clubs in and around his hometown. In 1952, he released his first No. 1 country song, "I'll Go On Alone". Four years later, he released his second No.1 hit “Singing the Blues”, and one year later, released two more No. 1 hits, "A White Sport Coat" and "The Story of My Life". In 1959, Robbins released his signature song, "El Paso", for which he won the Grammy Award for Best Country & Western Recording. The song began Robbins' association with western balladry, a style which would become a staple of his career. Later releases that drew critical acclaim include "Don't Worry", "Big Iron", “Devil Woman” and "Honkytonk Man", the last for which the 1982 Clint Eastwood film is named, and in which Robbins made his final appearance before his death.

Over the course of his career, Robbins recorded more than 500 songs and 60 albums, and won two Grammy Awards, was elected to the Country Music Hall of Fame and Nashville Songwriters Hall of Fame, and was named the 1960s Artist of the Decade by the Academy of Country Music. His songs "El Paso" and "Big Iron" were ranked by the Western Writers of America among the Top 100 Western songs of all time. Robbins was a commercial success in both the country and pop genres, and his songs were covered by many other famous artists, including Johnny Cash, the Grateful Dead and Elvis Presley. His music continues to have an influence in pop culture today, featuring prominently in several films, television shows and video games.

Early life

Robbins was born Martin David Robinson on September 26, 1925, in Glendale, a suburb of Phoenix in Maricopa County.

His father was of Scottish and German (possibly with some Polish) descent and played the harmonica. Marty's mother was of Scottish, German and English descent with maybe some Irish. His parents divorced in 1937.

Among the warmer memories of his childhood, Robbins recalled having listened to stories of the American West told by his maternal grandfather, 'Texas Bob' Heckle, who was a traveling salesman, raconteur and local medicine man. 
Robbins later recalled: "He had two little books of poetry he would sell. I used to sing him church songs and he would tell me stories. A lot of the songs I've written were brought about because of stories he told me. Like 'Big Iron' I wrote because he was a Texas Ranger. At least he told me he was."

Robbins dropped out of high school in Glendale, Arizona, before his time in the Navy. Robbins would work as an amateur boxer, dig ditches, drive trucks, deliver ice, and serve as a mechanics helper.

At 17, Robbins left home to serve in the United States Navy as an LCT coxswain during World War II. He was stationed in the Solomon Islands in the Pacific Ocean. To pass the time during the war, he learned to play the guitar, started writing songs, and came to love Hawaiian music.

After his discharge from the military in 1947 and his marriage the following year, Robbins began to play at local venues in Phoenix, In the early 1950's Marty moved on to host his own show on KTYL and then his own television show "Western Caravan" on KPHO-TV in Phoenix. After Little Jimmy Dickens made a guest appearance on Robbins' TV show, Dickens got Robbins a record deal with Columbia Records.

Career

Robbins became known for his appearances at the Grand Ole Opry in Nashville, Tennessee. Music journalist Mary Harron wrote the following about him in The Guardian:
Robbins was a symbol of the Nashville establishment that younger country fans abandoned in the Seventies for the bleached-denim "outlaw school" of Waylon Jennings and Willie Nelson. Robbins belonged to the Jim Reeves era and wore his embroidered cowboy suits proudly. Best known for the western ballad, El Paso, his career also touched the rock 'n' roll side of country in songs like White Sports Coat And A Pink Carnation, and he kept a touch of the dude about him to the end.

In 1980, Robbins appeared on the PBS music program Austin City Limits (season 5). In addition to his recordings and performances, Robbins was an avid race car driver, competing in 35 career NASCAR Grand National Series races with six top-10 finishes, including the 1973 Firecracker 400. In 1967, Robbins played himself in the car racing film Hell on Wheels. Robbins was partial to Dodges prepared by NASCAR Hall-of-Famer Cotton Owens, and owned and raced Chargers and then a 1978 Dodge Magnum. He was also the driver of the 60th Indianapolis 500 Buick Century pace car in 1976. His last race was in a Junior Johnson-built 1982 Buick Regal in the Atlanta Journal 500 on November 7, 1982, a month before his death.

Filmography

The Badge of Marshal Brennan (1957, 74 minutes) as Felipe, a Mexican outlaw
Raiders of Old California (1957, 72 minutes) as Timothy Voyle
Buffalo Gun (1958, released in 1961, 74 minutes) as Marty Robbins, a lawman
The Ballad of a Gunfighter (1963, 84 minutes) as Marty Robbins, an outlaw
Country Music Caravan (1964) as Himself, singing
Tennessee Jamboree (1964, 75 minutes) as Himself, singing 
Road to Nashville (1966, 109 minutes) as Himself, singing
Hell on Wheels (1967, 97 minutes) as Marty, a race car driver
From Nashville With Music (1969, 87 minutes) as Himself, singing
Country Music (1972, 93 minutes) as Himself, touring as singer, and as a race car driver
Guns of a Stranger (1973, 91 minutes) as Mathew Roberts
Honkytonk Man (1982, 122 minutes) as Smoky, a recording session singer

Death
Robbins developed cardiovascular disease early in life. After his third heart attack on December 2, 1982, he underwent quadruple coronary bypass surgery. He did not recover and died six days later, on December 8, at St. Thomas Hospital in Nashville.  He was 57 years old.

Music and honors
Although by 1960 Robbins' output was largely western (and some country) music, his initial hits like "Singing the Blues", "Knee Deep in the Blues", "The Story of My Life", "She Was Only Seventeen", and "A White Sport Coat and a Pink Carnation" were generally regarded as more pop/teen idol material than his hits from 1960 onwards ("El Paso" etc.). His 1957 recording of "A White Sport Coat and a Pink Carnation" sold over one million copies, and was awarded a gold record.
His musical accomplishments include the Grammy Award for his 1959 hit and signature song "El Paso", taken from his album Gunfighter Ballads and Trail Songs. "El Paso" was his first song to hit No. 1 on the pop chart in the 1960s. It was followed up, successfully, by "Don't Worry", which reached No. 3 on the pop chart in 1961, becoming his third, and last, Top 10 pop hit. "El Paso" was followed by one prequel and one sequel: "Feleena (From El Paso)" and "El Paso City". Also in 1961, Robbins wrote the words and music and recorded "I Told the Brook", a ballad later recorded by Billy Thorpe.

He won the Grammy Award for the Best Country & Western Recording 1961 for his follow-up album More Gunfighter Ballads and Trail Songs, and was awarded the Grammy Award for Best Country Song in 1970, for "My Woman, My Woman, My Wife". Robbins was named Artist of the Decade (1960–1969) by the Academy of Country Music, was elected to the Country Music Hall of Fame in 1982, was rewarded three awards at the 17th Annual Music City News Country Awards in 1983, and was given a Grammy Hall of Fame Award in 1998 for his song "El Paso".

When Robbins was recording his 1961 hit "Don't Worry" at the Quonset Hut Studio in Nashville, session guitarist Grady Martin accidentally created the electric guitar "fuzz" effect – his six-string bass was run through a faulty channel in the studio's mixing console. Robbins decided to keep it in the final version. The song reached No. 1 on the country chart, and No. 3 on the pop chart.
Robbins was inducted into the Nashville Songwriters Hall of Fame in 1975. For his contribution to the recording industry, Robbins has a star on the Hollywood Walk of Fame at 6666 Hollywood Boulevard.

Robbins has been honored by many bands, including the Grateful Dead who covered "El Paso" and Bob Weir & Kingfish who covered "Big Iron". The Who's 2006 album Endless Wire includes the song "God Speaks of Marty Robbins". The song's composer, Pete Townshend, explained that the song is about God deciding to create the universe just so he can hear some music, "and most of all, one of his best creations, Marty Robbins." The Beasts of Bourbon released a song called "The Day Marty Robbins Died" on their 1984 debut album The Axeman's Jazz. Both Frankie Laine and Elvis Presley, among others, recorded versions of Robbins' song "You Gave Me a Mountain", with Laine's recording reaching the pop and adult contemporary charts in 1969. Though Elvis never recorded any of Robbins' songs in the studio, he was a big fan and recorded "You Gave Me a Mountain" live in concert several times; it appeared on 15 Presley albums. Johnny Cash recorded a version of "Big Iron" as part of his American Recordings series, which is included in the Cash Unearthed box set. Cash also recorded other songs by Robbins, including "I Couldn't Keep From Crying", "Kate" and "Song Of The Patriot". He held Robbins in high esteem, having him guest several times on his network TV show. "Big Iron" was also covered by Mike Ness on his album Under the Influences, on which he paid homage to country music artists. The song, originally released on Robbins' 1959 album Gunfighter Ballads and Trail Songs, gained renewed popularity following its use in the video game Fallout: New Vegas.

His song "El Paso" was featured in the series finale of the AMC TV series Breaking Bad.  'El Paso' was also featured in the Only Fools and Horses prequel made by the BBC.

Robbins was awarded an honorary degree by Northern Arizona University.

In 2001, singer-songwriter Don McLean released his album, Sings Marty Robbins, which features a collection of songs recorded by Robbins in his career.

In 2016, a portion of Glendale Avenue in Robbins' hometown of Glendale, Arizona was renamed "Marty Robbins Boulevard".

Before Robbins passed away, he held a performance at the White House, alongside famous American singer Frank Sinatra.

He was named Man of the Decade by the Academy of Country Music in 1970.

Political views 

Marty Robbins was strongly conservative in his political views. He supported Barry Goldwater in his 1964 United States presidential election campaign as a southern director for "Stars for Barry". Two of his songs, "Ain't I Right" and "My Own Native Land" were rejected by Columbia Records as too controversial.  The lyrics of "Ain't I Right" describe anti-war protesters as communists.  After Columbia Records rejected the songs, Robbins' band member Bobby Sykes recorded the songs for Sims Records under the name Johnny Freedom.

Racing career
Robbins loved NASCAR racing.  With his musical successes, he was able to finance his avocation.  Robbins always tried to run at the big race tracks (Talladega Superspeedway, Daytona International Speedway) every year and a smattering of the smaller races when time permitted. Robbins had 6 top-ten finishes in his career, with a personal best top 5 finish at the 1974 Motor State 360 in Michigan.

Robbins' cars were built and maintained by Cotton Owens.  They were painted two-toned magenta and chartreuse, usually carrying car number 42 (though 6, 22, and 777 were also used).  Over the years, he ran a few makes and models (Plymouths, Dodges or Fords) before buying a 1972-bodied Dodge Charger from Owens. Robbins had a few major wrecks during the 1970s, and he had Owens rebuild the car to update the sheet metal to the 1973–1974 Charger specifications, and then finally 1978 Dodge Magnum sheet metal, which he raced until the end of 1980. Robbins' final NASCAR race car was a 1981 Buick Regal that he rented and drove in a few races in 1981 and 1982.

In 1972, at the Winston 500, Robbins stunned the competition by turning laps that were 15 mph faster than his qualifying time. After the race, NASCAR tried to bestow the Rookie of the Race award, but he would not accept it.  He had knocked the NASCAR-mandated restrictors out of his carburetor and admitted he "just wanted to see what it was like to run up front for once."

Robbins is credited with possibly saving Richard Childress' life at the 1974 Charlotte 500 by deliberately crashing into a wall rather than t-bone (broadside) Childress's car that was stopped across the track.

In 1983, one year after Robbins' death, NASCAR honored him by naming the annual race at Fairgrounds Speedway the Marty Robbins 420.

Robbins' Dodge Magnum was restored by Owens and donated to the Talladega Museum by his family, and was displayed there from 1983 to 2008.  The car is now in private hands in Southern California and raced on the Vintage NASCAR club circuit.

In 2014, Robbins' 1969 Dodge Charger Daytona was featured on an episode of Discovery Channels TV show Fat and Furious: Rolling Thunder. In that same year, an episode of Velocity's AmeriCarna featured ex-race team owner Ray Evernham spearheading the restoration of another of Robbins' NASCAR racers, a 1964 Plymouth Belvedere.

For the 2016 Darlington throwback weekend, Kyle Larson's No. 42 NASCAR Xfinity Series car was painted purple and gold in honor of Robbins. For the 2021 Goodyear 400, Tyler Reddick's RCR #8 Nascar Cup car carries Robbins' signature magenta and chartreuse livery. For the 2022 running, Corey LaJoie’s Spire Motorsports #7 ran a throwback to Robbins’ infamous 777 car that he ran in his career.

Discography

Robbins' discography consists of 52 studio albums, 13 compilation albums, and 100 singles. In his career, Robbins charted 17 Number One singles on the Billboard Hot Country Songs charts, as well as 82 Top 40 singles.

Robbins' highest-charting album is 1959's Gunfighter Ballads and Trail Songs. It charted to #6 on the all-genre Billboard 200, and was also certified Platinum by the Recording Industry Association of America. The album's first single, "El Paso", became a hit on both the country and pop charts, charting to Number One on the Hot Country Songs as well as the Billboard Hot 100. While that would be his only pop Number One, in 1957, "A White Sport Coat" charted to #2, and in 1961, "Don't Worry" charted to #3.

His final Top 10 single was "Honkytonk Man" from the 1982 eponymous film in which Robbins had a role.  He died shortly before its release.  Since his death, four posthumous studio albums have been released, but they made no impact on the charts.

Motorsports career results

Grand National Series

Winston Cup Series

Daytona 500

References

Sources
  Pruett, Barbara J. "Marty Robbins: Fast Cars and Country Music". Lanham, MD: Scarecrow Press. 2007. 
  Diekman, Diane "Twentieth Century Drifter: The Life of Marty Robbins" (Music in American Life). 2012.
 "Fallout: New Vegas" Big Iron is used on Radio New Vegas, Mojave Music Radio, and Black Mountain Radio.

External links

 
 Robbins page  at Country Music Hall of Fame
 Robbins page at Western Music Association
 Robbins page at Nashville Songwriters Hall of Fame
 Robbins bio by Hank Davis at AllMusic
 Robbins page by Gaylen Duskey at NASCAR
 
 
 
 

1925 births
1982 deaths
20th-century American guitarists
20th-century American male singers
20th-century American singers
American Christians
American acoustic guitarists
American anti-communists
American country guitarists
American country singer-songwriters
American male guitarists
American male singer-songwriters
American people who self-identify as being of Native American descent
Arizona Republicans
Burials in Tennessee
Columbia Records artists
Country Music Hall of Fame inductees
Country musicians from Arizona
Country musicians from Tennessee
Grammy Award winners
Grand Ole Opry members
Guitarists from Arizona
Guitarists from Tennessee
Musicians from Glendale, Arizona
Musicians from Nashville, Tennessee
NASCAR drivers
People from Brentwood, Tennessee
Racing drivers from Arizona
Racing drivers from Phoenix, Arizona
Racing drivers from Tennessee
Right-wing politics in the United States
Singer-songwriters from Tennessee
Sportspeople from Glendale, Arizona
Sportspeople from Nashville, Tennessee
Tennessee Republicans
United States Navy personnel of World War II
United States Navy sailors
Singer-songwriters from Arizona